Mansergh Snowfield is a snowfield in Antarctica feeding the central portion of Starshot Glacier, separating the Surveyors Range and Holyoake Range. It was seen by the Holyoake, Cobham and Queen Elizabeth Ranges party of the New Zealand Geological Survey Antarctic Expedition (1964–65) and named for G. Mansergh, a geologist with the party.

References

Snow fields of Oates Land